Cairdbeign is a rural locality in the Central Highlands Region, Queensland, Australia.

Geography 
There are a number of mountains in the locality:

History 
Cardbeign Provisional School opened circa 1894. On 1 January 1909, it became Cardbeign State School. It closed and re-opened a number of times due to fluctuating student numbers. It closed permanently circa 1931. Note that the spelling is slightly different to the locality name. It was on Dalmally Road.

Heritage listings 

Cairdbeign has a number of heritage-listed sites, including:
 Old Rainworth Stone Store, Wealwandangie Road

References

External links

Central Highlands Region
Localities in Queensland